Sword and sorcery is a subgenre of fantasy characterized by sword-wielding heroes in exciting and violent adventures.

It may also refer to these:

Books and literature
Swords and Sorcery, a 1963 anthology of fantasy short stories in the sword and sorcery subgenre 
Sword of Sorcery, a 1978 comics anthology featuring Fritz Leiber's Fafhrd and the Gray Mouser
Sword and Sorcery Studios, a publisher of role-playing game supplements
Sword and Sorceress series of fantasy short story anthologies

Games
Swords & Sorcery (SPI), a 1978 board game
Swords & Sorcerers, a 1978 role-playing game supplement for Chivalry & Sorcery
Swords and Sorcery (video game), a 1985 video game

Film
Sword & Sorcery Productions, a film production company founded by Milton Subotsky
The Sword and the Sorcerer, a 1982 film
Sword and  sorcery films, a list of genre films
Sword and sandal, a genre of Italian costume adventure epic films

Other
 Sword & Sworcery LP: The Ballad of the Space Babies, a video game score by Jim Guthrie